The 2011–12 Amlin Challenge Cup was the 16th season of the European Challenge Cup, Europe's second-tier club rugby union competition. The tournament began with two matches on 10 November 2011 and ended with the final on 18 May 2012 at the Twickenham Stoop in London. A total of 23 teams from six countries participated—20 in the pool stage, plus three teams parachuting into the knockout stages from the Heineken Cup. In an all-French final, Biarritz claimed their first Challenge Cup, defeating Toulon 21–18. The Basque club claimed a place in the 2012–13 Heineken Cup, which will be their 13th consecutive appearance in Europe's top club competition.

The defending Challenge Cup champions, England's Harlequins, did not initially have a chance to defend their crown because they had earned an automatic berth in the Heineken Cup. However, Quins parachuted into the knockout stage of this season's Challenge Cup, losing to Toulon in the quarter-finals.  All four semi-finalists were from France, equalling the achievement of 1996–97 and 1998–99.

Teams
Teams that parachuted in from the Heineken Cup are in italics.

Seeding
Teams that did not qualify for the 2011–12 Heineken Cup were ordered into four tiers according to the European Rugby Club Ranking. Five pools of four teams were drawn comprising one team from each tier.

The brackets show each team's European Rugby Club Ranking at the end of the 2010–11 season.

Pool stage

{| class="wikitable"
|+ Key to colours
|-
| style="background:#cfc;"|    
|Winner of each pool advances to quarterfinals.Seed # in parentheses.
|}

Pool 1

Pool 2

Pool 3

Pool 4

Pool 5

Knockout stage

Seeding
Following the end of the pool stage, the 5 pool winners were seeded alongside the top 3 2011–12 Heineken Cup pool runners-up who failed to qualify for the Heineken Cup quarter-finals.

(HC) Means a team has entered the competition from the Heineken Cup

Quarter-finals
To be played on the weekend of 5–8 April 2012.

Semi-finals
This is the fifth time that one country has supplied all four semi-finalists: they were all French in 1996–97 and 1998–99, and all English in the 2005–06 and 2007–08 seasons.

Final

References

 
2011–12 rugby union tournaments for clubs
2011–12 in European rugby union
2011–12 in English rugby union
2011–12 in French rugby union
2011–12 in Italian rugby union
2011–12 in Romanian rugby union
2011–12 in Spanish rugby union
2011–12 in Welsh rugby union
2011